Wathena may refer to:
Wathena (chief), a Native American chief of the Kickapoo tribe
Wathena, Kansas
USS Wathena (ID-3884), a cargo ship in commission in 1919
USS Wathena (YTB-825), a harbor tug placed in service in 1973